See You in Jail is a 1927 silent film comedy  directed by Joseph Henabery and starring Jack Mulhall. The film was produced by Ray Rocket and distributed through First National Pictures.

Cast
Jack Mulhall - Jerry Marsden
Alice Day - Ruth Morrisey
Mack Swain - Slossom
George Fawcett - Marsden, Sr.
Crauford Kent - Roger Morrisey
John Kolb - Jailer
William Orlamond - Inventor
Leo White - Valet
Carl Stockdale - Attorney
Burr McIntosh - Judge Hauser
Charles Clary - Rollins

Preservation status
A copy of the film is preserved in the British Film Institute(BFI), National Film and Television Archive, London.

References

External links
See You in Jail at IMDb.com

lobby poster

1927 films
American silent feature films
Films directed by Joseph Henabery
First National Pictures films
American black-and-white films
Silent American comedy films
1927 comedy films
Films with screenplays by Gerald Duffy
1920s American films
1920s English-language films
English-language comedy films